The Buckskin Council is the local council of the Boy Scouts of America (BSA) that serves Scouts in Kentucky, Ohio, Virginia and West Virginia.

Organization
The council is divided into several districts:
Adena District
Chief Cornstalk District
Mountain Dominion District
Seneca District
Shawnee District

History
Buckskin Council (#617)

In 1919, Charleston Council was formed and operated for around 10 years before being renamed the Charleston Area Council as it began to grow which was the name until 1949. In 1949, the council name was changed to Buckskin Council.

In 1990, Chief Cornstalk Council (#756) was forced to merge with Buckskin due to financial issues.  Chief Cornstalk Council had been created from many name changes and mergers. Starting as the Logan County Council (1926 - 1930) then rename Logan-Boone Area Council (1930-1935).  In 1934, Kentucky-West Virginia Council (#626 - 1930 -1934) merged with Logan-Boone Area Council.  After the merger in 1935, the council renamed itself to Logan-Boone-Mingo Area Council keeping that name into 1953.  In 1953, they again renamed to Cornstalk Council.  In 1954, they tweaked the name of the council to become Chief Cornstalk Council which lasted until the merger with Buckskin.  However, in 1979, the Lonesome Pine Council (#203) was split and part of it came into the Chief Cornstalk Council.

In early 1991, Appalachian Council (#707), which was made up of 9 counties in West Virginia and Virginia, merged with Buckskin Council in a unique form called a division. The Appalachian Division operated semi-as-a-separate council inside of Buckskin for about two years before they fully merged. It was made up of Tazewell County, Bland County and Giles County in Virginia along with Mercer County, McDowell County, Monroe County, Summers County, Raleigh County and Wyoming County in West Virginia. Merger occurred due to the downturn of coal in the coal counties, which limited the revenue from donations for the council. The roots of the Appalachian Council were much like Chief Cornstalk Council.  Council #707 was originally known as the McDowell County Council (1925–1928).  In 1928, it was renamed the Southern West Virginia Council which held until 1956. The original Appalachian Council (#673) served the Beckley, WV area from 1946 until 1955. In 1956, Southern West Virginia Council (#707) and Appalachian Council (#673) merged, keeping the council number 707 but changing the name to the Appalachian Council, as it was known when it merged with Buckskin.

Tri-State Area Council (#672) merged with Buckskin Council on July 1, 2014. Tri-State started off as the Huntington Council (1919–1924).  In 1924, it was renamed to Huntington Area Council until 1935.  In 1928, the Ashland Council (#200 - 1918–1928) merged with the Huntington Area Council.  In 1935, they renamed themselves as the Tri-State Area Council as they were serving parts of West Virginia, Kentucky, and Ohio.

Today Buckskin Council serves areas in West Virginia (21 counties), Virginia (3 counties), Kentucky (3.5 counties), and Ohio (3 counties).  The Summit Bechtel Reserve resides inside the Council's territory.

|-
|style="text-align: left;"|Notes:

|-
|style="text-align: left;"|Notes:

Camps
The Buckskin Council operates four camps: Camp Kootaga (in Walker, WV), Camp Arrowhead located in Ona, West Virginia. Camp Kiachuta Chester, Ohio, and Camp Cherokee Louisa, Kentucky. Camp Arrowhead hosted the Summer Camp Program while the remaining camps were weekend use facilities. Also a recently closed camp but still used for camporees and primitive camping, The Buckskin Scout Reservation (BSR) also referred to as Dilly's Mill, located in Dunmore, WV, Pocahontas County, WV. A portion of the camp was recently sold to the Nature Conservancy Fund (a subsidiary of Dominion Energy) for use as replacement for a portion of Seneca State Forest that will be used for a natural gas transport line. The portion sold consisted of approximately 1200 acres located on the west side of state route 28 all the way to the Greenbrier River, but had no buildings or camp facilities located on it. The council made $1.7 million on the sale of the property according to records on file at the Pocahontas County courthouse.

Chief Cornstalk Council had Camp Chief Cornstalk.

The original Appalachian Council has a camp called Camp Minter in the Beckley area.  After the merger with Buckskin it was sold because the city had up around it and limited the use of the Camp. However, after the merger with Southern West Virginia Council, Camp Roland became the main camp for the new Appalachian Council. Camp Roland in Bland County, VA.

The council also has access to Summit Bechtel Reserve.

See also
Scouting in West Virginia

References

Local councils of the Boy Scouts of America
Youth organizations based in Virginia
Southern Region (Boy Scouts of America)
1919 establishments in West Virginia